The Mashhood Test Firing Range (MTFR) at Tilla Jogian  is a Pakistan Army's military testing area and a firing range located approximately  west of Jhelum, Punjab, Pakistan. 

It was used by the Khan Research Laboratories (KRL) as a primary testbed for initial phase of its Ghauri program and now serves as the primary weapon test site for the Pakistan Army.

Location 

Tilla is an eastward continuation of the Salt Range in Jhelum District, Punjab, Pakistan, 3,242 feet above the sea. From the Bunha torrent the range rises rapidly to the culminating peak of Tilla Jogian and thence sinks as rapidly, but a series of low parallel ridges runs out across the valley of the Kahan. During British Rule, the hill was sometimes used as a summer resort by officers of Jhelum District. A famous monastery of Jogi fakirs is situated here.

Current operations 

The test range is known as Tilla Test Firing Range by the Pakistan Army sources. The Pakistan Army has conducted exercises at the Tilla Firing Range to measure its manned tactical systems,electromagnetic radiation, and conducts missile testing and range recovery operations. 
 
In 1998–99, the Test Firing Range served as a testbed for the Khan Research Laboratories (KRL) during its earliest development of the Ghauri program. Other operations included Pakistan Air Force's range practice with the Pakistan Army, and subsequent missile testing by its strategic command.

References

Jhelum District
Space programme of Pakistan
Rocket launch sites
Weapons test sites
Pakistan federal departments and agencies
Military installations in Punjab, Pakistan
Military facilities of the Pakistan Army